Science & Technology Australia (STA), formerly known as the Federation of Australian Scientific and Technological Societies (FASTS), is an organisation representing the interests of more than 90,000 Australian scientists and technologists, and promoting their views on a wide range of policy issues to the Australian Government, Australian industry, and the Australian community.

Science & Technology Australia is Australia’s peak body in science and technology and represents more than 90,000 Australian scientists and technologists working across all scientific disciplines. STA is a regular contributor to debate on public policy, with a mission to bring together scientists, governments, industry and the broader community to advance the role, reputation and impact of science and technology across the nation.

The organisation was known as the Federation of Australian Scientific and Technological Societies (FASTS) until June 2011.  The Federation was formed in late 1985, as a reaction to the 1984 Australian Federal Budget, which made substantial cuts to funding for science; its formation followed the statements of the then Minister for Science, (Barry Jones), that the Australian science and technology community did not provide him with sufficient support in his dealings with cabinet.

The organisation is best known for the annual Science Meets Parliament event, the Superstars of STEM program and the STEM Ambassadors program.

STA's CEO is Misha Schubert and its current President is Professor Mark Hutchinson, who began his term in November 2021.

STA member societies
Science & Technology Australia members are societies and organisations that represent the professional interests of scientists and technologists across Australia. Members are split into different clusters.

 members include:

 Aboriginal and Torres Strait Islander Mathematics Alliance (ATSIMA)
 ARC Centre of Excellence in Future Low-Energy Electronics Technologies (FLEET)
 ARC Centre for Excellence in Engineered Quantum Systems (EQUS)
 ARC Centre of Excellence in Exciton Science (ACEx) 
 Astronomical Society of Australia (ASA)         
 AuScope
 Australia's Academic and Research Network (AARNET)
 Australian-American Fulbright Commission
 Australian and New Zealand Optical Society (ANZOS)
 Australian Cardiovascular Alliance (ACvA)
 Australian Coral Reef Society (ACRS)
 Australian Council of Deans of Information and Communications Technology (ACDICT)
 Australian Council of Deans of Science (ACDS)
 Australian Council of Engineering Deans (ACED)
 Australian Council of Environmental Deans and Directors (ACEDD)
 Australasian eResearch Organisations (AeRO)
 Australian Freshwater Sciences Society (AFSS)
 Australian Genomic Technologies Association (AGTA)
 Australian Geoscience Council (AGC)
 Australian Institute of Nuclear Science and Engineering (AINSE)
 Australian Institute of Physics
 Australian Mammal Society (AMS)
 Australian Mathematical Society (AustMS)
 Australian Marine Sciences Association Inc (AMSA)
 Australian Mathematical Sciences Institute (AMSI)
 Australian Meteorological Oceanographic Society (AMOS)
 Australian Microscopy & Microanalysis Society (AMMS)
 Australian Museum Research Institute 
 Australian & New Zealand Optical Society (ANZOS)
 Australia Nuclear Association (ANA)
 Australian Neuroscience Society 
 Australian Psychological Society (APS)
 Australian Physiological Society (AuPS)
 Australasian Quaternary Association (AQUA)
 Australian Radiation Protection Society (ARPS)
 Australian Society for Biochemistry and Molecular Biology (ASBMB)
 Australian Society for Biomaterials and Tissue Engineering (ASBTE)
 Australian Society for Biophysics (ASB)
 Australian Society for Fish Biology
 Australian Society for Operations Research (ASOR)
 The Australasian Society for Stem Cell Research (ASSCR)
 Australian Science Innovations
 Australian Society for Parasitology
 Australian Society for Phycology and Aquatic Botany (ASPAB)
 Australian Society of Clinical and Experimental Pharmacologists and Toxicologists (ASCEPT)
 Australian Society of Microbiology (ASM)
 Australian Society of Plant Scientists (ASPS)
 Australian Society of Viticulture and Oenology (ASVO)
 Baker Heart and Diabetes Institute
 Bioplatforms Australia
 Centre for Nanoscale BioPhotonics (CNBP)
 Cicada Innovations
 Computing Research and Education Association of Australia (CORE)
 Council of Australian Postgraduate Associations (CAPA)
 CSIRO Staff Association
 Deadly Science
 Ecological Society of Australia (ESA)
 Genetics Society of AustralAsia (GSA)
 High Blood Pressure Research Council of Australia (HBPRCA)
 Institute of Australian Geographers (IAG)
 International Ocean Discovery Program (IODP)
 Mathematics Education Research Group of Australia Incorporated (MERGA)
 Medicines Australia
 Monash Biomedicine Discovery Institute
 National Computational Infrastructure (NCI)
 National Tertiary Education Union (NTEU)
 National Youth Science Forum
 New Edge Microbials Pty Ltd
 Nutrition Society of Australia (NSA)
 Pawsey Supercomputing Centre
 Phenomics Australia
 Professionals Australia
 Psychology Foundation of Australia
 Reproductive Health Australia (RHA)
 Royal Australian Chemical Institute (RACI)
 Society for Reproductive Biology (SRB)
 Society of Crystallographers in Australia and New Zealand (SCANZ)
 Society of Environmental Toxicology and Chemistry Australia (SETAC)
 Soil Science Australia
 South Pacific Environmental Radioactivity Association (SPERA)
 Statistical Society of Australia (SSA)
 Therapeutic Innovations Australia
 The Royal Society of Victoria Inc.
 Women in Aviation International Australian Chapter (WAI)
 Women in STEMM Australia

References

External links

Scientific societies based in Australia
1985 establishments in Australia
Federations